Vác is a town in Pest county in Hungary with approximately 35,000 inhabitants. The archaic spelling of the name is Vácz.

Location
The town is seated at the foot of the Naszály Mountain in the foothills of the Carpathians.

Modern Vác
Vác is a commercial center as well as a popular summer resort for citizens of Budapest. The Vác Cathedral, built 1761–1777, was modelled after St. Peter's Basilica in Rome. The episcopal palace houses a museum for Roman and medieval artifacts. The city is also known for its 18th-century arch of triumph and for its beautiful baroque city center.

History
Settlement in Vác dating as far back as the Roman Empire has been found. The origin of its name is debated. One hypothesis says that the name comes from a Hungarian tribal name "Vath". Another theory says the name comes from Czecho-Slovak personal name Vac (Vác), which is the diminutive form of Václav.

It has been the seat of a Roman Catholic bishopric since the 11th century. Bishops from the Roman Catholic Diocese of Vác were influential within the Kingdom of Hungary, with many serving as chancellors or later becoming archbishops.

On 17 March 1241, due to the attack of Mongols the population was slaughtered and Mongols set up camp there. After the departure of the Mongols, Vác was rebuilt and German colonists were invited to the town.

The town was conquered by the Ottoman Empire in 1541. During the Habsburg monarchy's wars against the Ottomans, the Austrians won victories against the Turks at Vác in 1597 and in 1684. After the Great Turkish War, Vác was rebuilt and repopulated. This re-population was both spontaneous and planned. According to the Truce of Zsitvatörök, Habsburg control of the fortress at Vác (also known as Vacz) was maintained, and its repair was sanctioned.

During the Hungarian Revolution and War of Independence of 1848-49, the Honvédség routed the Austrian forces stationed in the city after a major battle (April 10, 1849); the Second Battle of Vác ended in Russian victory (July 17).

During World War II, Vác was captured on 8 December 1944 by Soviet troops of the 2nd Ukrainian Front in the course of the Budapest Offensive.

Demographics

Ethnicity
 Hungarians : 94.9%
 Romani people    : 1.3%
 Germans    : 0.5%
 Romanians  : 0.1%
 Slovaks    : 0.5%
 Ukrainians : 0.1%
Other/Undeclared: 4.5%

Religious denomination
Roman Catholic: 59.4%
Greek Catholic: 0.7%
Calvinist: 9.3%
Lutheran: 3.1%
Other denomination: 1.4%
Non-religious: 14.4%
Undeclared: 11.5%

According to the 1910 census,
the religious make-up of the
town was the following:

Roman Catholic: 76.3%
Jewish: 11.2%
Calvinist: 8.3%
Lutheran: 2.8%
Other denomination: 1.4%

Notable people 

 Géza I, King of Hungary
 Tibor Gánti, theoretical biologist and biochemist
 Nat Nichols, componist, jazz pianist and missionary.

Twin towns – sister cities

Vác is twinned with:

 Deuil-la-Barre, France
 Donaueschingen, Germany
 Dubnica nad Váhom, Slovakia
 Givatayim, Israel
 Järvenpää, Finland
 Odorheiu Secuiesc, Romania
 Otrokovice, Czech Republic
 Šahy, Slovakia
 Sarıyer, Turkey
 Tiachiv, Ukraine
 Zawadzkie, Poland

Gallery

References

External links

Official website
The newsportal
Live webcam from the square
Map of Vác
Map of the surrounding area
Tragor Ignác Museum of Vác
Katona Lajos Town Library
Aerial photographs: Vác
Vác at funiq.hu

 
Populated places in Pest County
Serb communities in Hungary